This was the first edition of the tournament as part of the Legión Sudamericana.

Francisco Cerúndolo won the title after defeating Camilo Ugo Carabelli 6–4, 6–3 in the final.

Seeds

Draw

Finals

Top half

Bottom half

References

External links
Main draw
Qualifying draw

Santa Cruz Challenger - 1